The IIHF European Cup, also known as the Europa Cup, was a European ice hockey club competition for champions of national leagues which was contested between 1965 and 1997, governed by the International Ice Hockey Federation (IIHF).

History
The competition was originated by Günther Sabetzki, based on the European Cup of association football (now UEFA Champions League).

The tournament encountered problems. Countries had different levels of development in ice hockey, so some teams were weaker than others, resulting in a number of uncompetitive, one-sided games. Organisational difficulties were also posed by the refusal of some Soviet Union teams to play away games in certain places. This resulted in no final being held some years, and more than one final being held in others. The competition was discontinued after 1997. In its place, the European Hockey League and the Continental Cup, and later the IIHF European Champions Cup, were started.

Format
Teams were seeded and drawn into groups of four teams, with the winners of each group progressing to the next round, where they were drawn into groups again. Each round was played over a long weekend (Friday to Sunday) in a single venue, until one final group was left, the winner of which would be considered the champion. After the European Cup was discontinued, the Continental Cup would adopt this format.

Winners
Knockout, 1965/66–1977/78

Group, 1978/79–1989/90

Knockout, 1990–1996

Source:

By nation

See also
European Hockey League
IIHF Continental Cup
IIHF European Champions Cup
Spengler Cup

References

External links
IIHF Club Competition History on IIHF.com

 
European Cup
International Ice Hockey Federation tournaments
European international sports competitions
Recurring sporting events established in 1965
1965 establishments in Europe